Rise to Power is the fourth studio album by Kane & Abel. It was released on September 21, 1999, via Elektra Records, and was produced by the duo. The album addresses their then-recent federal indictment for cocaine possession.

The album peaked at No. 61 on the Billboard 200. It made it to No. 11 on the Top R&B/Hip-Hop Albums chart, but was not as successful as the group's previous album, Am I My Brother's Keeper. As of 2004, Rise to Power had sold over 115,000 copies.

Critical reception
Vibe gave the album a negative review, commenting that the duo were unable to "recapture their glory days as part of Master P's camp." 

Rolling Stone wrote: "Funkified guitar riffs and percussion strokes transcend Kane and Abel's merely adequate verbal jousting, making Rise to Power a decent CD that could have been exceptional had the lyrics been as soul-stirring as the beats." USA Today listed it as the fifth worst R&B album of 1999.

Track listing
"Parental Advisory" – :23
"Rise to Power (Illegal Business)" – 2:51
"The Possibility" – 3:40
"Tony Manteca I" – :45
"Get Cha Weight Up" – 3:01 (feat. Boss Player & Ghinn)
"Beat It Up" – 3:59 (feat. Skandalust)
"Straight Thuggin'" – 3:51 (feat. Twista & Solé)
"Get Cha Mind Right" – 3:39
"Tony Manteca II" – :26
"I Don't Care" – 4:37 (feat. Aaron Hall)
"Let 'Em Come" – 3:47 (feat. The Medicine Men & Lunatic)
"State's Evidence" – 3:26 (feat. Boss Player, Ghinn, Skandalus & Tommy Two Face)
"Let Them Hands Go" – 3:12
"Show Me What Cha Workin' Wit" – 3:44
"This Life" – 4:04
"Lock Me Up" – 1:12
"Hit the Block" – 3:15
"Hydroponix" – 4:20 (feat. Dion Marshall)
"Brave N's" – 3:39
"Joke's on You Jack" – :11
"Get Cha Mind Right" (Spanish Version) – 3:42 (feat. Boss Player & Ghinn)

References

1999 albums
Kane & Abel (group) albums